Russell Gentry Clark (July 27, 1925 – April 17, 2003) was a United States district judge of the United States District Court for the Western District of Missouri.

Education and career

Born in Oregon County, Missouri, Clark was a lieutenant in the United States Army during World War II, from 1944 to 1946, and later received a Bachelor of Laws from the University of Missouri-Columbia School of Law (now the University of Missouri School of Law) in 1952. He was in private practice in Springfield, Missouri from 1952 to 1977.

Federal judicial service

On June 13, 1977, Clark was nominated by President Jimmy Carter to a seat on the United States District Court for the Western District of Missouri vacated by Judge William H. Becker. Clark was confirmed by the United States Senate on July 1, 1977, and received his commission on July 5, 1977. He served as Chief Judge from 1980 to 1985, and assumed senior status on August 1, 1991. Clark retired completely from the bench on July 31, 2000.

Notable case

Clark ordered tax increases to come up with the massive amounts of money he ordered to be spent by the Kansas City school district in the case of Missouri v. Jenkins. Starting with his order "federal judges ordered more than $2 billion in new spending by the school district to encourage desegregation."

Death

He died on April 17, 2003, in Springfield.

See also
History of Kansas City

References

Sources
 

1925 births
2003 deaths
University of Missouri alumni
Judges of the United States District Court for the Western District of Missouri
United States district court judges appointed by Jimmy Carter
20th-century American judges
United States Army officers
Missouri lawyers